Mie to 未唯mie: 1981–2023 All Time Best is a compilation album by Japanese singer Mie. Released through Victor on March 1, 2023 to coincide with the 40th anniversary of Mie's solo career, the album compiles her solo works from 1981 to 2006, plus the unreleased song "Oyasuminasai" and her cover of Leonard Cohen's "Hallelujah".

Track listing

References

External links
 

Mie albums
Japanese-language compilation albums
Victor Entertainment compilation albums
2023 compilation albums